Small Church of Saint Anne or Chiesetta di Sant'Anna may refer to

 Small Church of Saint Anne (Alcamo)
 Small Church of Saint Anne (Brugherio)

See also 
 Church of St. Ann (disambiguation)